Francis Marshall may refer to:

Francis Albert Marshall (1840–1889), British playwright
Francis Marshall (U.S. Army officer) (1867–1922), U.S. Army general
Francis Marshall (British Army officer) (1876–1942), British Army general
Francis Marshall (physiologist) (1878–1949), British human physiologist
Francis Marshall (cricketer) (1888–1955), English cricketer

See also
Frank Marshall (disambiguation)
Frances Marshall (disambiguation)